Princess of the Row is a 2019 American independent drama film directed by Max Carlson, written by A. Shawn Austin and Max Carlson, produced by A. Shawn Austin, produced by Edi Gathegi, and starring Edi Gathegi, Tayler Buck, Ana Ortiz, Jacob Vargas and Martin Sheen.  Morgan Freeman and Lori McCreary served as executive producers of the film.

Cast
Edi Gathegi as Beaumont "Bo" Willis
Taylor Buck as Alicia Willis
Ana Ortiz as Magdalene Rodriguez
Jacob Vargas as Donald
Martin Sheen as John Austin
Blake Michael as Pete
Tim Abell as Junk Yard Owner

Release  
The film premiered on March 9, 2019 as part of the Cinequest Film Festival.

Reception
John DeFore of Hollywood Reporter said Princess of the Row is "an uneven but sincere portrait of filial devotion."

References

External links
 
 

2019 films
2019 independent films
2019 drama films
American independent films
American drama films
2010s English-language films
2010s American films